The 2015–16 Little Rock Trojans women's basketball team represented the University of Arkansas at Little Rock during the 2015–16 NCAA Division I women's basketball season. The Trojans, led by thirteenth year head coach Joe Foley, played their home games at the Jack Stephens Center and were members of the Sun Belt Conference. They finished the season 20–13, 16–4 in Sun Belt play to finish in 2nd place. They advanced to the championship game of the Sun Belt women's tournament where they lost to Troy. They were invited to the Women's National Invitation Tournament where they lost in the first round to Saint Louis.

Roster

Schedule

 
|-
!colspan=9 style="background:#800000; color:white;"| Non-conference regular season

|-
!colspan=9 style="background:#800000; color:white;"| Sun Belt Conference regular season

|-
!colspan=9 style="background:#800000; color:white;"| Sun Belt Women's Tournament

|-
!colspan=9 style="background:#800000; color:white;"| WNIT

See also
 2015–16 Little Rock Trojans men's basketball team

References

Little Rock Trojans women's basketball seasons
Little Rock
2016 Women's National Invitation Tournament participants